Jack Thorpe (born 1881) was a professional football player. Nicknamed Deadeye, he played eight games in the National Football League during the 1923 season with the Oorang Indians. The Indians were a team based in LaRue, Ohio, composed only of Native Americans, and coached by his brother, Jim Thorpe. Like Jim, Jack was a member of the Sac and Fox Nation.

Notes

1881 births
Native American sportspeople
Oorang Indians players
Sac and Fox people
Year of death missing